The Worcester Art Museum, also known by its acronym WAM, houses over 38,000 works of art dating from antiquity to the present day and representing cultures from all over the world. WAM opened in 1898 in Worcester, Massachusetts, and ranks among the more important art museums of its kind in the nation. Its holdings include some of the finest Roman mosaics in the United States, outstanding European and American art, and a major collection of Japanese prints.  Since acquiring the John Woodman Higgins Armory Collection in 2013, WAM is also home to the second largest collection of arms and armor in the Americas.  In many areas, it was at the forefront in the US, notably as it collected architecture (the Chapter House, 1932), acquired paintings by Monet (1910) and Gauguin (1921), presented photography as an art form (1904). The Worcester Art Museum also has a conservation lab and year-round studio art program for adults and youth.

History 
In September 1896, Stephen Salisbury III and a group of his friends founded the Art Museum Corporation to build an art institution "for the benefit of all." Salisbury then gave a tract of land, on what was once the Salisbury farm (now fronting Salisbury Street in Worcester, Massachusetts), as well as $100,000 USD to construct a building designed by Worcester architect Stephen C. Earle. The museum formally opened in 1898 with the Rev. Daniel Merriman as its first president. The museum's collection then consisted largely of plaster casts of "antique and Renaissance" sculptures, as well as a selection of 5,000 Japanese prints, drawings, and books, willed to the museum from John Chandler Bancroft, son of John Bancroft.

In 1905, Stephen Salisbury died and left the bulk of his five million-dollar estate to the museum. The Worcester Art Museum continued to grow and slowly amassed one of the important art collections in the country, with some of the significant early works donated or loaned by the artist and collector Helen Bigelow Merriman.

Between 1932 and 1939, the Worcester Art Museum joined a consortium of museums and institutions to sponsor expeditions to the archaeological sites where the city of Antioch once stood. This group of museums, including Princeton University, the Musée du Louvre, the Baltimore Museum of Art, and Harvard University's affiliate, Dumbarton Oaks, discovered hundreds of intricate floor mosaics. The Antioch mosaics, as they are now known, were split up among the institutions The WAM received many mosaics including the Worcester Hunt, which is now installed in the Renaissance Court's floor.

On May 17, 1972, the museum suffered a major theft of artwork. Two men wearing masks entered the museum just before closing. The two men stole The Brooding Woman and Head of a Woman by Paul Gauguin, Mother and Child by Pablo Picasso, and St. Bartholomew, then attributed to Rembrandt, a collection of works worth over one million dollars. Four individuals were charged with the theft as well as the theft of seven artworks stolen from the Boyden Library at Deerfield Academy.

In 2013, Worcester's Higgins Armory Museum closed its doors and its renowned collection of arms and armor was integrated into WAM's. A permanent arms and armor gallery will open no later than 2023; in the meantime, major works from the Higgins collection are on view in galleries throughout the museum, alongside Greek, Roman, Asian, and European works of art. The museum is also rethinking its institutional narrative, leveraging the quality and depth of the collection to tell a story that is an alternative to those told by other museums in the area.  The guiding principle for this endeavor is WAM's new mission statement (adopted in 2017):  The Worcester Art Museum connects people, communities, and cultures through the experience of art.

Architecture 

The Worcester Art Museum started as a small three-story building, designed by Stephen C. Earle of Earle & Fisher, and constructed by Norcross Brothers in 1897–98.[4] Very little of the exterior of this original building can be viewed due to the multiple expansions the museum has undertaken. From the start this was the expectation, as Stephen Salisbury and his architects planned the original building as the southern component of a larger structure, five times the size, which would have a central courtyard and front onto Salisbury Street.  The first expansion was a rear wing in 1920–21, designed by one of the original architects, Clellan Waldo Fisher, in a matching style. The most distinctive addition was added in 1931–33 in the form of the large wing facing Salisbury Street. Designed to include the Chapter House and Renaissance Court, this addition was designed by William Truman Aldrich of Boston, an architect known for museums. This was followed in 1939-40 by the addition of a fourth floor to the original building, designed by G. Adolph Johnson of Worcester.

The next addition was not until 1970, thirty years later, when the Higgins Education Wing, designed by The Architects Collaborative, was added. This building added studios, classrooms, exhibition spaces and a new main entrance. The most recent major addition was the Frances L. Hiatt Wing, added in 1983 on the east side of the original building. Designed by Irwin A. Regent & Associates of Worcester, it is intended for special exhibitions. These later buildings, though they do not match the style of the earlier buildings, are complementary to them in material and color. In November 2015, the museum unveiled a new walkway ramp at the Salisbury Street entrance. Designed by Kulapat Yantrasast of wHY Architects, the bridge-like structure boldly combines contemporary design with the museum's 1933 Beaux-Arts exterior while making the historic main entrance fully accessible.

In 1927, the museum purchased a 12th-century French chapter house that was originally part of the Benedictine Priory of St. John at Bas-Nueil, in the commune of Berrie, Vienne in France. Installed in 1932, and linked to the museum in 1933 via the grand Renaissance Court, the chapter house was the first medieval building ever transported from Europe to America.[13] The remaining portion of the priory at Bas-Nueil was designated a monument historique in 1988. Decorating the Renaissance Court floor is unequivocally one of Worcester's greatest ancient treasures – a group of Antioch mosaics dating from the first through the sixth century A.D, which was excavated at Antioch in Syria.

Collection 

In addition to the Roman, mosaic-laden, Renaissance court and French chapter house, strengths of the permanent collection include collections of European and North American painting, prints, photographs, and drawings; Asian art; Greek and Roman sculpture and mosaics; and Contemporary art.

European paintings include some Flemish Renaissance paintings, an El Greco, a Rembrandt, and a room of Impressionist and 20th-century works by Monet, Matisse, Renoir, Gauguin, and Kandinsky. The American painting collection includes works by Thomas Cole, Winslow Homer, John Singer Sargent, William Morris Hunt, Elizabeth Goodridge, among others. In the 20th-century gallery, the Museum displays works by Franz Kline, Jackson Pollock, and Joan Mitchell.In 1901, John Chandler Bancroft, a wealthy Bostonian, bequeathed more than 3,000 Japanese prints. The Bancroft Collection spans the history of woodcut printmaking in Japan, with particular strength in rare, early images from the late 17th and 18th centuries. Salisbury's estate donation included many portraits commissioned by his family, as well as sculpture, furniture, and silver. These works, by artists such as Gilbert Stuart, Thomas Crawford, and Samuel F.B. Morse and the craftsmen Paul Revere, Edward Winslow, and Nathanial Hurd, constituted the nucleus of the American collections.

American Art

European Art

Asian Art

Arms and Armor

Directors 
 Philip T. Gentner 1908–1917
 Raymond Wyer (changed his name in 1923 to Raymond Henniker-Heaton) 1918–1925
 George W. Eggers 1926–1930
 Francis Henry Taylor 1931–1939
 Charles H. Sawyer 1940–1947
 Louisa Dresser Campbell (acting director) 1943–1946
 George L. Stout 1947–1955
 Francis Henry Taylor 1955–1957
 Daniel Catton Rich 1958–1970
 Richard Stuart Teitz 1970–1981
 Tom L. Freudenheim 1982–1986
 James A. Welu 1986–2011
 Matthias Waschek 2011 –

Management 
The Worcester Art Museum operates on a $10M annual budget and is governed by an active 25-member Board of Trustees, made up of local, national, and international members with expertise in finance, investment, museum management, art history, education, and real estate development. In addition, WAM has a 200-member Corporation and over 3,000 members and 100 Business Partners. It employs 65 full-time and 128 part-time personnel (including 56 professional artist faculty) and enlists hundreds of volunteers and docents. In November 2017, the Museum was awarded reaccreditation by the American Alliance for Museums.

Prior to becoming Director of WAM in 2011, Matthias Waschek, PhD, served as executive director and Curator of the Pulitzer Arts Foundation (2003–2011) and Head of Academic Programs at the Louvre Museum in Paris (1992–2003).

Special exhibitions 
April 10, 2021 – January 16, 2022 What the Nazis Stole from Richard Neumann (and the search to get it back)

References

External links 

WAM library at the Internet Archive

Art museums established in 1898
Museums in Worcester, Massachusetts
Art museums and galleries in Massachusetts
1898 establishments in Massachusetts
Museums of ancient Greece in the United States
Museums of ancient Rome in the United States
Museums of American art
Asian art museums in the United States